Vladimir "Vladica" Popović (17 March 1935 – 10 August 2020) was a Serbian professional footballer and manager. The biggest success in his coaching career was winning the Intercontinental Cup with Red Star Belgrade in 1991.

Born in Zemun, Popović started playing at local side Jedinstvo but his talent was spotted while he was still very young and giants Red Star Belgrade brought him to their youth team where he will later play for more than a decade becoming team captain and also regular member of the Yugoslav national team. He was part of the team that won the silver medal at the 1956 Summer Olympics.
 
Popović began coaching football in Venezuela in the 1970s, leading Portuguesa FC, Caracas F.C. and Deportivo Italia. He also managed Colombian sides Deportivo Cali and Millonarios as well as the Peru national football team.

Honours

Player

Club
Red Star Belgrade 
Yugoslav First League: 1955–56, 1956–57, 1958–59, 1959–60, 1963–64
Yugoslav Cup: 1957–58, 1958–59, 1963–64
Mitropa Cup: 1958

International
Yugoslavia
Summer Olympics Second place: 1956

Manager
Independiente Santa Fe 
Categoría Primera A: 1971

Atlético Nacional 
Categoría Primera A: 1973

Deportivo Cali
Categoría Primera A: 1974

Napredak Kruševac
Yugoslav Second League (East): 1977–78

Red Star Belgrade
Yugoslav First League: 1991–92
Intercontinental Cup: 1991

References

External links

Profile at Serbian federation official site 

1935 births
2020 deaths
People from Zemun
Footballers from Belgrade
Serbian footballers
Yugoslav footballers
Yugoslavia international footballers
Red Star Belgrade footballers
VfB Stuttgart players
Stuttgarter Kickers players
Yugoslav expatriate footballers
Expatriate footballers in Germany
Expatriate footballers in West Germany
Expatriate footballers in Venezuela
1958 FIFA World Cup players
1962 FIFA World Cup players
1993 Copa América managers
Yugoslav football managers
Serbian football managers
Red Star Belgrade non-playing staff
Red Star Belgrade managers
Deportivo Italia managers
Independiente Santa Fe managers
Atlético Nacional managers
Deportivo Cali managers
Millonarios F.C. managers
Yugoslav First League players
Bundesliga players
Peru national football team managers
Association football midfielders
Medalists at the 1956 Summer Olympics
Olympic silver medalists for Yugoslavia
Yugoslav expatriate football managers
Expatriate football managers in Colombia
Expatriate football managers in Peru
Expatriate football managers in Venezuela
Yugoslav expatriate sportspeople in Colombia
Yugoslav expatriate sportspeople in Germany
Yugoslav expatriate sportspeople in Venezuela